Kemps (legal name Kemps LLC) is an American dairy company located in St. Paul, Minnesota. It has been a subsidiary of Dairy Farmers of America since being purchased in 2011 from HP Hood LLC. Dairy Farmers of America is based in Kansas City, Missouri, but Kemps continues to be headquartered in St. Paul. Products provided by the company include milk, cottage cheese, half and half, egg nog, cream, juices, sour cream, chip dips, ice cream, yogurt and novelties. Most of these products are sold at grocery stores throughout the midwestern United States, but some are available in other parts of the country as well. Kemps currently operates five manufacturing facilities in Minnesota and Wisconsin.

History
Kemps was founded in 1914 by William Henry Kemps (October 29, 1878 – October 2, 1964), formerly of St. Louis, Missouri, who partnered with W.S. Lathrop after his Minneapolis candy company was near bankruptcy. The business was first known as Lathrop-Kemps Ice Cream Company, producing "special quality" Kemps Ice Cream. As part of the agreement, Lathrop would have to maintain his sobriety as he had issues with alcoholism. This didn't happen, and Kemps would soon become sole owner of the company.

Kemps suffered from chronic health problems during his life. In 1921, the doctor advised that he may not be able to survive too many more winters in Minnesota. Kemps and his family visited California later that year. They would eventually purchase a home in Beverly Hills and move there in 1924. At the same time, Kemps sold his company to competitor Crescent Creamery of St. Paul. Brothers Arthur, Howard and W.R. Cammack, who owned Crescent Creamery, would operate both businesses as Kemps-Crescent.

In 1961, Kemps-Crescent would merge with Marigold Dairies of Rochester, Minnesota and Dolly Madison Dairies of Eau Claire, Wisconsin to form Marigold Foods, Inc. The company would merge with Ward Food Services of Maplewood, Minnesota in 1968. Ten years later, Dutch company NV Wessanen Koninklijke Fabrieken (now Royal Wessanen) bought Marigold Foods from Ward Food Services.

National Dairy Holdings purchased Marigold Foods and its subsidiaries from Royal Wessanen in 2001, only to be acquired by HP Hood three years later in a deal that also involved Crowley Foods of Binghamton, New York. Marigold Foods would be renamed Kemps LLC in 2002 as most products provided by the company were of the Kemps brand. In 2011, the company would be sold by HP Hood to Dairy Farmers of America.

Acquisitions
Kemps has acquired numerous dairy companies to expand business, including:

Clover Leaf Dairy Company of Minneapolis, Minnesota in 1979.
Fairmont Foods Company, Inc. of Green Bay, Wisconsin in 1980. (dairy division only)
Green's Ice Cream of York, Pennsylvania in 1992.
Brown's Velvet Dairy of New Orleans, Louisiana in 1993. (sold to Suiza Foods in 2000, acquired by Dean Foods in 2001)
Cedarburg Dairy, Inc. of Cedarburg, Wisconsin in 1993.
Hagan Ice Cream of Pittsburgh, Pennsylvania in 1996.
Becker's Dairy of Chicago, Illinois in 1998.
Gillette Dairy, Inc. of Norfolk, Nebraska and Rapid City, South Dakota in 1999.
Goodrich Ice Cream of Omaha, Nebraska in 1999.
Oak Grove Dairy of Norwood, Minnesota in 2000.
Cass-Clay Creamery of Fargo, North Dakota in 2012.

Cass-Clay Creamery and Goodrich Ice Cream are subsidiaries of Kemps.  Green's Ice Cream and Hagan Ice Cream are currently subsidiaries under HP Hood.  All other brands were discontinued.

Kemps had started a joint venture with Franklin Foods of Duluth, Minnesota and Associated Milk Producers, Inc. in 1982, making products under the Arrowhead Dairy brand. Franklin Foods closed the plant in 2013.

References

External links
Official website
Cass-Clay Creamery
Goodrich Ice Cream

Dairy farming
Manufacturing companies based in Saint Paul, Minnesota
History of Minneapolis
Food and drink companies established in 1914
1914 establishments in Minnesota
Yogurt companies
Dairy products companies of the United States
American brands